Victoria "Odette" Pavlova (Russian: Одетте (Виктория) Павлова; born 25 April 1994)  is a Russian fashion model.

Odette Pavlova was born in Pskov, Pskov Oblast, but currently lives in Saint Petersburg, Russia. Victoria has a twin sister Lia (Yulia), who is also a top model.

She has appeared in editorials of Bon Magazine, Dazed, Heroine Magazine, i-D, Interview, LOVE, November Magazine, Numéro (French and Russian), Self Service, Vogue Germany, Vogue Italia, Vogue Japan, Vogue Spain, Vogue Paris, Vogue Russia and W Magazine.

References

External links 
Odette Pavlova at Models.com.
Odette Pavlova on Instagram.
Odette Pavlova in VK (personal page)

1994 births
Living people
Russian female models
Female models from Saint Petersburg
Twin models
Next Management models